The Blue and White Front (formerly Freedom Party – Finland's Future) is an ultranationalist political party in Finland which was founded in 2009.

History
The VP was founded on 4 April 2009. In September 2010, leader of the Finnish People's Blue-Whites in the Turku county council, Olavi Mäenpää, joined the VP, and became the party's first city councillor. In November, Turku city councillor Maarit Rostedt of the National Coalition Party also defected to the VP, as well as former True Finns city councillor Kalevi Satopää in Salo. The party changed its name in 2013.

The party contested its first election in the 2011 Finnish parliamentary election.

Policies
The party calls for a ban on construction of mosques and minarets, removal of beggars from the streets and reduction in foreign aid. It also opposes nuclear power and mandatory teaching of Swedish.

Election results

Parliamentary elections

References

External links
 

Political parties established in 2009
Non-registered political parties in Finland
2009 establishments in Finland
Anti-immigration politics in Europe
Nationalist parties in Finland
Eurosceptic parties in Finland
Far-right political parties
Right-wing populism in Finland
Right-wing populist parties
Conservative parties in Finland
National conservative parties